For the unrelated 1989 film L.A. Heat, see L.A. Heat (film).

L.A. Heat is an American action fiction television series starring Wolf Larson and Steven Williams as Los Angeles police detectives. The series aired on TNT for two seasons beginning March 15, 1999.

Show history
Produced by PM Entertainment, L.A. Heat began filming 1996, in areas that included Los Angeles, Beverly Hills, San Diego, Long Beach and Hollywood. But due to the fact the show didn't have the backing of a major network, it was not picked up for domestic distribution in the U.S. It was instead sold overseas where, in its second season, it accomplished the impossible: it took the #1 spot away from Baywatch in Germany. The show was also popular in Lebanon after being broadcast on Lebanese Broadcasting Corporation International, and was broadcast in other Arabic speaking countries. In France, the show was aired Monday through Friday at 6PM on M6 and reran several times since due to its popularity. The show's big budget car chases and explosions were in part sourced from scenes from feature films also produced by PM Entertainment.

Due to financial troubles within PM Entertainment, production ended in 1998 after just two seasons. A year later, the show finally premiered in the U.S. when it was sold to the cable network TNT. All 48 episodes were shown Monday through Friday at 4PM for almost two years. Afterwards, airings became more and more sporadic, sometimes only a few times a week and in the early morning hours. When TNT's contract to run the show expired, it disappeared from the airwaves and has not been aired on television in the United States since. In 2000, plans to resurrect the show for a third season were underway but ultimately fell through when financing could not be secured.

The show is (as of 2017) available on Amazon Prime Video for $2 per episode.

Premise
The show follows the action-packed adventures of two Los Angeles robbery/homicide detectives, Chase McDonald and August Brooks. The detectives are as different as night and day, but they work great together at keeping the streets of L.A. safe. Chase also makes extra money on the side by selling metal sculptures he makes himself, while August spends his free time running a youth center for underprivileged teens.

Main characters
Detective Chester "Chase" McDonald (Wolf Larson) has been with the Los Angeles Police Department for seven years. A risk-taker, McDonald likes to live on the edge and is passionate about his work. Though a born leader, he often needs the guidance of someone with his partner's experience to keep him out of trouble. In his free time he enjoys making metal sculptures. He's in a relationship with Jodi when the series starts, but after they broke up, he began dating a variety of women, but none of them ever worked out. Despite their initial resentments towards each other, he began dating Det. Nicole Stockman towards the end of the second season.

Detective August Brooks (Steven Williams) is a seasoned veteran with sixteen years on the Los Angeles Police Department. In his youth, August was a promising boxer, a contender in every sense of the word, who always put his opponents down in the ring. But after discovering that his manager and promoter were embezzling funds from fellow boxers, and after he was forced to throw his first pro fight, August became disillusioned with the sport and left to join the police academy. Discovering he was a natural at police work, he quickly rose through the ranks of the LAPD to become a detective. He also runs the Hoover Street Youth Boxing Center in his spare time, an old gym he bought and converted into a recreation area for underprivileged children, providing an alternative to gang life. He also served in the Vietnam War.

Kendra Brooks (Renee Tenison) is the love of August's life, and works at the recreation center. Like August, she is known by all the kids who frequent the place, and she helps them with their problems from time to time. She and August have been married for five years at the start of the series.

Jodi Miller (Dawn Radenbaugh) is Chase's girlfriend. Having never been happy with Chase's job, she always expressed concern for his life and tried talking him into quitting many times to concentrate completely into his art. In episode "Killing on Lily Lane", she got a job offer to run an art gallery in Dallas, Texas and began pressuring him even more to quit and come with her. Chase refused to do so, insisting they could work things out, but ultimately, Jodi left without him.

Captain Robert Jensen (Kenneth Tigar) is the high-tempered superior of Chase and August. Despite the aggravation they usually cause him, he still considers them his best detectives.  Despite appearing frequently in all but a few episodes, Kenneth Tigar is never billed in the opening titles, only at the end of each episode's billing of guest stars.

Recurring characters
Arnold Cragmeyer (Christopher Boyer) is the head of the forensics lab and tends to always come through in helping Chase and August uncover clues and other useful information. He has a bachelor's degree is Forensic Science, and was previously a bomb squad commander in the premiere episode before requesting a transfer.

Det. Sam Richardson (Clay Banks) is another detective who assists Chase and August from time to time. He's originally from New York, but transferred to Los Angeles sometime prior to the third episode. Chase was the first cop he met and he wasn't too impressed with him, but he eventually grew to like him.

Det. Benny Lewis (Sugar Ray Leonard) was another detective who occasionally assisted Chase and August. He only appeared in the first, second, and fourth episodes before disappearing without explanation.

Annie Mason (Jessica Cushman) is a forensics assistant who joined midway through the first season. Her father is a detective in Riverside, California.

Dr. Judith Sands (Jessica Hopper) is the department's psychologist, whose assistance Chase and August sometimes require when dealing with the more crazed suspects. Her and Chase had a past relationship until he dumped her, claiming she was driving him crazy by always trying to get inside his head. She also had a somewhat successful (though short-lived) modeling career before becoming a psychologist.

Dr. Samantha Morecroft (Debbie James) is the new head coroner at the start of the second season. She's straightforward and to-the-letter, and is constantly put off by Chase's sly comments and flirting.

Det. Jack Lawson (Michael McFall) is a former D.E.A. agent who used his connection within the police department (his Aunt Grace, the police commissioner) to transfer to the department's robbery/homicide division. He thinks Chase is a little too on the reckless side, but ultimately comes to respect him.

Det. Nicole Stockman (Sandra Ferguson / Jillian McWhirter) is a beautiful but tough San Francisco detective. She came to Los Angeles to deliver a witness to the LAPD. Initially finding herself in conflict with Chase and his methods, they eventually became friends over the phone and through weekend visits. At the end of the second season, she returned to Los Angeles to strike a deal with a crime boss in return for him testifying against Bobby Cole. Her and Chase were getting serious about her transferring to LA so she could move in with him, but she was killed in a hit ordered by Bobby Cole.

Bobby Cole (Gary Hudson) was introduced early in the second season and became the show's only recurring adversary. Known as the "Teflon crime lord," he was a notorious criminal with everyone from politicians to police officers on his payroll and could never be connected to any of his crimes. Everybody in the city knew he was a vicious criminal who had committed dozens of crimes, but no one could prove it. After numerous confrontations, his organization was finally broken down, and Cole was shot and killed by Chase in the series finale.

Other appearances
 Sam J. Jones made two guest appearances on the show: as a good guy in the first-season episode "Old Scores" and as a bad guy in the second-season episode "Legacy of A Buffalo Soldier."
 Angelo Tiffe made two appearances as August Brooks' former partner, Robert "The Falcon" Hatcher, in the episodes "The Falcon" and "Death House."
 Sarah Douglas made an appearance as police boss "Wilma" in the first-season episode "Electra".

Episode list

Season 1 (1999)

Season 2 (1999)

Episodes aired out of order
TNT aired a handful of episodes in each season out of order, which results in some confusion when watching the episodes in question. (The DVD release does not fix this mistake). Below is a comparison list of the episodes as aired and how they should be viewed.

 Season 1

 Season 2

Home media
In August 2005, the first season of L.A. Heat was released on DVD by Platinum Disc, LLC. The five-disc set contains all 26 episodes in the same order as they aired on television. Aside from brief biographies for Wolf Larson and Steven Williams on the packaging, there are no bonus features.

Worldwide airdates
Although L.A. Heat premiered in the US on March 15, 1999, it premiered earlier in other parts of the world.

 Germany - January 20, 1997
 France - March 16, 1997
 Portugal - May 18, 1997
 Russia - June 9, 1997
 Australia - December 8, 1997
 Malaysia - July 9, 1998
 Italy - June 21, 1999
 Estonia - February 15, 2001
 Hungary - March 2004

Filming locations
 The building used for establishing shots of the police station is actually the Donald C. Tillman Water Reclamation Plant in Van Nuys. It is part of The Japanese Garden, and both are open to the public. Wide shots of this building, in the series, are taken from the 1992 PM Entertainment production C.I.A.: Codename Alexa.
 Sevens, the beachfront restaurant that the characters frequented, is actually the Venice Bistro, located in Venice, Los Angeles.

References

External links

The L.A. Heat Fan Page

American action television series
1999 American television series debuts
1999 American television series endings
1990s American crime drama television series
Television shows set in Los Angeles
Fictional portrayals of the Los Angeles Police Department
TNT (American TV network) original programming